Congal may refer to:

Congal Cáech (died 637), king of the Cruithne of Dál nAraidi in Ireland
Congal Cláiringnech, legendary High King of Ireland, reigned during the reign of Ptolemy XII Auletes (80–51 BCE) or 135–120 BCE or 184–169 BCE according to different sources
Congal Biomarine Station, a protected nature reserve in Esmeraldas Province, Ecuador

See also
Conghail, a surname